(Danish) or  (Norwegian) is a traditional Danish and Norwegian confection, often eaten on special occasions in Scandinavia. In English, the name means wreath cake. In Denmark it is typically eaten as part of New Year celebrations, while a variation of the cake, is traditionally served at weddings and baptisms.

The origin of the Kransekage can be traced to the 18th century, where it was first created by a baker in Copenhagen..

Preparation
Kransekage take the form of a series of concentric rings of cake, layered on top of each other in order to form a steep-sloped cone shape—often 18 or more layers—stuck together with white icing. Kransekage cake rings are made with almonds, sugar, and egg whites. The ideal kransekage is hard to the touch, yet soft and chewy.

Serving 
This confection is served by separating individual rings and breaking them into smaller pieces. In recent years the kransekake when mass-produced is sold year round in the shape of dessert bars. Mass-produced kransekake is available in stores around Christmas and before New Year's Eve.

One cultural tradition is for the bride and groom to lift the top layer of the cake at their wedding. The number of cake rings that stick to the top one when they lift it is said to be the number of children the couple will have.

The world's tallest Kransekake was baked in 2006 by the supermarket Coop in Oslo in celebration of their 100th anniversary. The cake was 13.17 meters tall and made from over 700 kilograms of dough.

Variations 
The original variant used at weddings is called overflødighedshorn (English: horn of plenty) and is shaped like a cornucopia and filled with chocolates, cookies, and other small treats. Sometimes a bottle of wine or akvavit is placed in the center, and the cake is decorated with ornaments such as crackers and flags.

Bite-sized versions of the cake, called Kransekakestenger (English: wreath cake rods) are often prepared for Christmas. They are then similarly decorated with white icing, though they may also be dipped in chocolate.

Gallery

See also
 Krokan – Swedish pastry which uses the same ingredients

References

External links 
How-to video in English

Norwegian desserts
Danish cakes
Christmas cakes
Almond dishes
Layer cakes